John Adams Kiiapalaoku Kuakini (1789–1844) was  an important adviser to Kamehameha I in the early stages of the Kingdom of Hawaii. He was responsible for contributing to the infrastructure among other changes in the Kona District during this era.

Family life

He was born about 1789 with the name Kaluaikonahale.  His father was Keʻeaumoku Pāpaiahiahi, an alii (noble) from the island of Hawaii, and his mother was NāmāhānaiKaleleokalani, the widow queen and half-sister of the late king of Maui, Kamehameha Nui. Historian Samuel Kamakau later makes the contradictory claim that Kaʻiana was Kuakini's father and also claimed he was a poʻolua child  (possessing two head or father).

Keʻeaumoku became a fugitive from King Kahekili II of Maui. Escaping to Hana, the family moved back to Hawaii island and lived on Kahaluu Bay. He was the youngest of four important siblings: sisters Queen Kaahumanu, Kamehameha's favorite wife and later became the powerful Kuhina nui, Kalākua Kaheiheimālie and Namahana-o-Piia, also queens of Kamehameha, and brother George Cox Kahekili Keeaumoku, who later became the Governor of Maui. His father helped Kamehameha I come to power in the battle of Mokuōhai in 1782.

With the introduction of Christianity, Hawaiians were encouraged to take British or American names.
As an example of his royal manner, he chose the name John Adams after John Quincy Adams, the U.S. president in office at the time. He adopted the name as well as other customs of the U.S. and Europe.

As a youth he excelled at sports such as canoeing, but later acquired a taste for alcohol, fine food, and women. He seriously injured his foot, however, trying to escape after being caught with the wife of Governor Kuihelani of Oahu. He recovered, but walked with a limp for the rest of his life. Like many of Polynesian royal lineage, he had a large stature. A visitor in 1819 described him as about 6 feet 3 inches, and in his later days was said to have weighed over 400 pounds.

He married Keouawahine and Kaniuʻopiohaʻaheo or Haʻaheo. With Keouawahine, he had one son Keoua, who died in infancy, and with Haʻaheo, he had one daughter Mele Kaʻauʻamoku o Kamānele (1814–1834). Kamānele was considered to be a potential bride for King Kamehameha III, but she died young. The king later married Kalama, the daughter of ship pilot Naihekukui.

Royal Governor

When the Kingdom's central government moved to Lahaina in 1820, his influence expanded on Hawaii island. After John Young had effectively but unofficially served in the role, Kuakini was appointed the first recorded Royal Governor of Hawaii island, serving from 1820 until his death. However, on April 1, 1831, a potential rebellion was uncovered on the island of Oahu. His sister Queen Regent Kaahumanu appointed him Royal Governor of Oahu after Kuini Liliha, the leader of the rebellion, he resided at Fort Honolulu serving as the Commander in Chief.
Some time in the next few years he moved back to the island of Hawaii after Kaahumanu died and Elizabeth Kīnau became Queen Regent, calling herself Kaahumanu II. From 1841 through 1843 he served in the House of Nobles.

He gave land to missionaries, such as Asa Thurston to build Mokuaikaua Church, and others on the island. He extended a series of low walls that were originally used as Ahupuaa (traditional land division) barriers for pigs, because the cattle left behind by George Vancouver were wandering through the village of Kailua. This work became known as Ka pā nui o Kuakini ("The Great Wall of Kuakini"), some of which still stands today.

In the village he built Hulihee Palace in the American style out of native lava, coral lime mortar, koa and ohia timbers.  Completed in 1838, he used the palace to entertain visiting Americans and Europeans with great feasts. He made official visits to all ships that arrived on the island, offering them tours of sites such as the Kīlauea volcano.

Kuakini died December 9, 1844 in Kailua-Kona. He left Hulihee Palace to his hānai (adopted son) William Pitt Leleiohoku I, who left it to his wife Princess Ruth Keelikōlani.

Legacy

Hulihee Palace is now a museum run the Daughters of Hawaii, including some of his artifacts.
A highway is named "Kuakini Highway", which runs from the Hawaii Belt Road through the town of Kailua-Kona, to the Old Kona Airport State Recreation Area. He is also the namesake of Kuakini Street, Honolulu, which is in turn the namesake of the Kuakini Medical Center on it.

Ancestry

References

1789 births
1844 deaths
Governors of Hawaii (island)
Governors of Oahu
Members of the Hawaiian Kingdom House of Nobles
Hawaiian Kingdom politicians
House of Kekaulike
Royalty of the Hawaiian Kingdom
History of Hawaii (island)
Converts to Christianity from pagan religions
Hawaiian Kingdom Protestants
Commanders-in-chief of the Hawaiian Kingdom